The Serbian Academy of Sciences and Arts (Srpska akademija nauka i umetnosti, SANU) is a national academy and the most prominent academic institution in Serbia, founded in 1841 as Society of Serbian Letters.

The Academy's membership has included Nobel laureates Ivo Andrić, Leopold Ružička, Vladimir Prelog, Glenn T. Seaborg, Mikhail Sholokhov, Aleksandr Solzhenitsyn, and Peter Handke as well as, Josif Pančić, Jovan Cvijić, Branislav Petronijević, Vlaho Bukovac, Mihajlo Pupin, Nikola Tesla, Milutin Milanković, Mihailo Petrović-Alas, Mehmed Meša Selimović, Danilo Kiš, Dmitri Mendeleev, Victor Hugo, Leo Tolstoy, Jacob Grimm, Antonín Dvořák, Henry Moore and many other scientists, scholars and artists of Serbian and foreign origin.

History

Predecessors

The Serbian Royal Academy of Sciences was the successor to the Serbian Learned Society with which it merged in 1892 and accepted its members as its own either regular or honorary members, its tasks and its place in scientific and cultural life. The same had occurred several decades earlier when the Serbian Learned Society on 29 July 1864 took over the place and functions of the Society of Serbian Scholarship, the first learned society in the Principality of Serbia, founded on 7 November 1841. The Serbian Royal Academy of Sciences was led by members, such as Jovan Cvijić.

In 1864, the Society elected to its membership international revolutionary figures as Giuseppe Garibaldi, Nikolay Chernyshevsky, and Alexander Herzen, and was immediately abolished for this action by the conservative government of Prince Mihailo Obrenović.

Founding of Serbian Royal Academy

Since the Serbian Academy of Sciences and Arts was founded by law (as the Serbian Royal Academy) of 1 November 1886, it has been the highest academic institution in Serbia. According to the Royal Academy Founding Act, King Milan was to appoint the first academic, who would then choose other members of the academy. The names of the first academics were announced by King Milan on 5 April 1887. At that time, there existed four sections in the academy, which were then called "specialised academies". Four academics were appointed to each section:

Academy of Natural Sciences
 Josif Pančić
 Dimitrije Nešić
 Jovan Žujović
 Ljubomir Klerić

Academy of Philosophy
 Stojan Novaković
 Milan Kujundžić Aberdar
 Svetislav Vulović
 Svetomir Nikolajević

Academy of Social Sciences
 Čedomilj Mijatović
 Milan Đ. Milićević
 Ljubomir Kovačević
 Panta Srećković

Academy of Arts
 Ljubomir Nenadović
 Matija Ban
 Mihailo Valtrović
 Davorin Jenko

Departments

Department of Mathematics, Physics and Geo Sciences
Department of Chemical and Biological Sciences
Department of Technical Sciences
Department of Medical Sciences
Department of Languages and Literature
Department of Social Sciences
Department of Historical Sciences
Department of Arts

Institutes

Institute for Serb Studies
Institute for Byzantine Studies
Geographical Institute "Jovan Cvijić"
Ethnographical Institute
Institute for the Serbian Language
Institute of Technical Sciences
Mathematical Institute
Institute of Musicology

Building

From 1909 till 1952 Serbian Academy of Science and Arts Building was located at 15 Brankova Street. Unfortunately, this building was demolished in 1963. After that the Academy was moved to 35 Knez Mihailova Street, in a magnificent building in the city centre, where it has remained up to now. Serbian Academy of Science and Arts (SASA), the highest scientific institution in Serbia, has been decorating Knez Mihailova Street for almost one century, bringing the spirit of French decorations and Art Nouveau in the architecture of Belgrade.

The sketches, proposals and designs for the construction of this magnificent building were created from the first day of its founding in 1886; however, the Academy did not move in the building until 1886. Right after the founding of the Academy, the erection of the building was considered at the representative location in Knez Мihailova Street, which Prince Mihailo Obrenović III donated for educational cause.

Considering the fact that apart from the plot Serbian Royal Academy (SRA) had no other financial resources, the erection of the temporary ground-floor building was considered until the conditions are fulfilled for the construction of the representative object in which two important national institutions were supposed to be located:  The Serbian Country Museum and The National Library. In the following years SRA considered various ways of forming funds and acquiring financial resources for the construction of its building. The mutual fund of SRA, National Library and The Serbian Country Museum was formed in 1896 by the King's Decree, so that with the initial capital and its own plot, the Academy was able to begin solving the construction problem.

Affirmed architect of domestic architecture Кonstantin Jovanović  was hired to make the design in 1900. It was the first project in a row which remained unrealized: starting from the plea to eminent architectures Аndra Stevanović, Nikola Nestorović, Milan Kapetanović  and Dragutin Đorđević, to make the preliminary designs, through the unsuccessful announcement of the public competition, until the attempt to form the project resembling the building of Yugoslav Academy of Science and Arts from Zagreb and new designs of an architect Konstantin Jovanović. At the same time, with the attempts to obtain the adequate design, the interest of the three institutions for the construction of the common building was not constant. Dealing with the problem of permanent location, in 1908 SRA got to use the space in the building of Sima Igumanović endowment at 15 Brankova Street. After more than two decades of attempting to obtain its own building, the Presidency of SRA, by the end of 1910 decided to entrust the design to Dragutin Đorđević and Andra Stevanović. The cornerstone was laid on 27 March 1914, by the Crown Prince Aleksandar Karađorđević in the presence of the academics and the Ministers of Construction and Education. The construction works were assigned to the Matija Bleh's company, whereas the facade plastics and sculptural program were done by Jungmann and Sunko. However, the construction was interrupted by the beginning of the First World War.

The object was finished in 1924, but due to high construction expenses, SRA failed to move into its new building; instead of that, the entire object was rented. Believing that the design of the SRA building was supposed to transfer the advanced ideas, architects Stevanović and Đorđević created the design which did not rely on the previous designs in terms of its spatial and functional composition. Large sized building, which takes over the entire plot, was designed with the apartments and stores for rent and with richly оrnamented Art Nouveau decorated passages. In dealing with the facades, the authors did not completely abandoned the academic models of designing; they modernized one symmetrical, three-part division of facade canvas by introducing rounded corners, additionally emphasized with semi-circular bay windows. By introducing Art Nouveau elements in the form of three-part windows, of the аrabesque secondary plastic, modern designed details on the shop windows on the ground floor and the mezzanine, with the elements of French decorations, the authors achieved the luxurious facade program. The architectural plastic in the shape of floral arabesques, garlands and Art Nouveau masks, got a new dimension in the attic in the form of full sculpture of the symbolic meaning. The central motif of the main facade is the sculpture composition The Goddess Nika joining the trade and industry, whereas almost identical sculptural compositions The woman with the children were placed on the corners of the central protruding bay. One of those female sculptures is holding a torch in her hand, and the other one a pigeon. The identical compositions of children sculptures were placed in the attics above the corners of the building and along the side facades, creating one of the richest sculptural programs of Belgrade architecture before the First World War. SRA was in the rented building in Brankova Street when the Second World War ended.

Right after the end of the war, in 1947 The Law on Serbian Academy of Science brought certain changes in its structure, when instead of the expert academies, six departments were formed as well as the certain number of the institutes. With the enlarged spectre of activities, the need for the necessary spatial capacities increased significantly, so the primary goal was the conversion of the entire building in Knez Mihailova Street into the office space, which included an extensive adaptation. The design was assigned to an architect Grigorij Samojlov, who, along with an architect Đorđe Smiljanić  completed the transformation of the inner part of the building, at the same time completing one of the most important interior designs. Samojlov showed extraordinary skill by reshaping the existing object into the almost compact academic combination with central atrium, he formed a two-tract office system, completely eliminated the passages, except for the central one, which was partially redesigned into the main entrance hall, whereas the ground floor kept its commercial character. The creation of the entrance from Knez Mihailova Street and designing of the access to the conference hall contributed to the realization of the representative space. According to the new concept, Samojlov designed the exterior in the modernized academic style with purified geometrized decorative repertoire. At the same time, the Congress hall was adapted, gaining the gallery and in the arched niches two paintings "The Science", painted by Petar Lubarda and "The Art", painted by  Мilo Milunović. Along with the adaptation certain changes were made on the very facade: the glass marquise was removed from the mezzanine, the mezzanine windows were changed, as well as the shop windows on the ground floor, a decorative dome was reconstructed and a cornice and all decorative elements were removed.

The building was officially and solemnly opened on 24 February 1952, when the Academy finally and permanently moved in into the building. In 1967, Samojlov did the design for the adaptation of the gallery on the corner of Knez Mihailova and Vuka Karadžića Street. Perfectly composed interior left room for additional improvement during the next couple of years, so that until today it has been enriched by our eminent artists. The glass gaps of the final collimation line in the entrance hall were replaced by the stained glass done in 2000, after the drawings by Branko Miljuš , whereas the stained glass windows in the Congress Hall and in the foyer in front of the hall were made after the design of the academic Mladen Srbinović in 2005. Serbian Academy of Science and Arts, as the most significant scientific institution in Serbia, gave the biggest contribution to the improvement of the scientific thought, gathering many prominent names of Serbian, Yugoslav and world science and artistic creation. Its building, built at one of the most representative locations of Belgrade urban space, with its architecture makes the inevitable part of the evaluation of, not only local, but also national construction heritage for almost one century. Taking into consideration the undeniable values and the importance, it was designated as a cultural monument in 1992.

A complete reconstruction of the exterior and interior was announced in 2020, with the goal being to complete the works in 2024 and make space for a new concert hall.

Electoral assemblies

New members of the Academy are elected on the electoral assemblies, which have been held every third year since 1985.

In order to make room for academics from a wider field of arts, "Department of Fine Arts and Music" was renamed to "Department of Arts" in 2021, which was the first major organisational change in the Academy after a number of years.

List of presidents

List of Nobel laureates
There have been 20 members of the Serbian Academy of Sciences and Arts who were honoured with the Nobel Prize.

Full members

Foreign members

List of Pulitzer laureates

Full members

See also
 List of SANU members
 Vojvodina Academy of Sciences and Arts
 Institute for Balkan Studies
 Memorandum of the Serbian Academy of Sciences and Arts
 Academy of Sciences and Arts of the Republika Srpska

References

Sources

Sofija Škorić and George Vid Tomashevich, The Serbian Academy After A Century: An Institution at Risk?, published by The Serbian Heritage Academy of Canada, Toronto, 1987.

External links

 

 
Serbian culture
Historiography of Serbia
National academies of sciences
National academies of arts and humanities
Organizations established in 1841
1841 establishments in Serbia
Scientific organizations established in 1841
Organizations based in Belgrade
Educational institutions established in 1841
Kingdom of Serbia
Members of the International Council for Science
Members of the International Science Council
Academy of Sciences and Arts
Academy of Sciences and Arts
Buildings and structures in Belgrade
Arts in Serbia
Academy of Sciences and Arts
Arts organizations established in the 1840s
Romanesque Revival architecture